Abeer Hamza is a scholar and lecturer of Modern Standard Arabic
and Egyptian Arabic in the Department of Near Eastern Languages and Cultures at the University of California, Los Angeles.

Education and Teaching Experience
Hamza received Arabic instructor training from the University of Texas at Austin, and she received her Ph.D. from Ain Shams University in Cairo in 2000. She has taught courses there, was a visiting lecturer at Middlebury College, as well as a lecturer of Arabic and Spanish at California State University, Los Angeles before coming to UCLA.

Current Position
She is currently the Arabic program coordinator at UCLA, and her responsibilities include assessing student competence in the language and creating complementary materials to enhance learning.

In addition to her native Arabic, she is also fluent in English and Spanish and has working knowledge of French.

References

External links
Abeer Hamza's UCLA Website

Living people
Ain Shams University alumni
University of California, Los Angeles faculty
University of California Near Eastern Languages and Cultures faculty
Year of birth missing (living people)